Pali is a town and a nagar palika in Umaria district in the Indian state of Madhya Pradesh.

Geography
It has an average elevation of 450 metres (1,476 feet).

Demographics
 India census, Pali had a population of 150,868. Males constitute 52% of the population and females 48%. Pali has an average literacy rate of 60%, higher than the national average of 59.5%: male literacy is 70%, and female literacy is 50%. In Pali, 16% of the population is under 6 years of age.

References

Cities and towns in Umaria district